Arthrobacter pascens is a bacterium species from the genus of Arthrobacter which occurs in soil. Arthrobacter pascens produces arthrobactin, porphyrins and choline oxidase.

References

Further reading

External links
Type strain of Arthrobacter pascens at BacDive -  the Bacterial Diversity Metadatabase

Bacteria described in 1953
Micrococcaceae